Paratrechus is a genus of beetles in the family Carabidae, containing the following species:

 Paratrechus alaoensis Mateu, 1999
 Paratrechus alexandri Trezzi, 1995
 Paratrechus altitudinis Mateu, 1974
 Paratrechus austrinus Moret, 2005
 Paratrechus balli Barr, 1982
 Paratrechus barri Mateu, 1999
 Paratrechus batesi Mateu, 1974
 Paratrechus beltrani Mateu, 1974
 Paratrechus bifoveatus (Jeannel, 1920)
 Paratrechus bolivari Mateu, 1974
 Paratrechus boussingaulti Mateu & Moret, 2001
 Paratrechus campbelli Mateu, 1999
 Paratrechus cataractae Barr, 1982
 Paratrechus chiriquensis Barr, 1982
 Paratrechus clermonti Jeannel, 1928
 Paratrechus collanensis Mateu, 1999
 Paratrechus contrarius Barr, 1982
 Paratrechus costaricensis Mateu, 1974
 Paratrechus cubillini Mateu & Moret, 2001
 Paratrechus erwini Barr, 1982
 Paratrechus franiai Barr, 1982
 Paratrechus gouleti Mateu, 1999
 Paratrechus grandiceps Ueno, 1968
 Paratrechus gressitti Ueno, 1968
 Paratrechus halffteri Mateu, 1974
 Paratrechus hoegei (Jeannel, 1920)
 Paratrechus incertus Mateu, 1999
 Paratrechus jeanneli Barr, 1982
 Paratrechus laevigatus Jeannel, 1928
 Paratrechus laticeps Barr, 1982
 Paratrechus mandurensis Mateu, 1999
 Paratrechus matilei Mateu & Moret, 2001
 Paratrechus mexicanus (Putzeys, 1870)
 Paratrechus moreti Mateu, 1999
 Paratrechus nemoralis Mateu & Moret, 2001
 Paratrechus nigrilacus Mateu & Moret, 2001
 Paratrechus oaxaquensis Barr, 1982
 Paratrechus obrieni Mateu, 1981
 Paratrechus osorioi Bolivar & Pieltain, 1943
 Paratrechus pallescens (Bolivar & Pieltain, 1967)
 Paratrechus panamensis Mateu, 1999
 Paratrechus pecki Barr, 1982
 Paratrechus propior Barr, 1982
 Paratrechus putzeysi Barr, 1982
 Paratrechus reddelli Barr, 1982
 Paratrechus reyesi Mateu, 1974
 Paratrechus subparallelus Mateu, 1999
 Paratrechus sylvarum Mateu, 1974
 Paratrechus sylvaticus (Bolivar & Pieltain, 1941)
 Paratrechus tacana Barr, 1982
 Paratrechus totontepec Barr, 1982
 Paratrechus unisetosus Mateu, 1999
 Paratrechus versutus Mateu, 1999
 Paratrechus vulcanus Mateu, 1999

References

Trechinae